Elena Valeryevna Ginko (born 30 July 1976) is a Belarusian race walker. She was born in Gomel.

Achievements

References
 
 

1976 births
Living people
Belarusian female racewalkers
Athletes (track and field) at the 2004 Summer Olympics
Athletes (track and field) at the 2008 Summer Olympics
Olympic athletes of Belarus
Sportspeople from Gomel